Colonel Sun is a novel by Kingsley Amis published by Jonathan Cape on 28 March 1968 under the pseudonym "Robert Markham". Colonel Sun is the first James Bond continuation novel published after Ian Fleming's 1964 death. Before writing the novel, Amis wrote two other Bond related works, the literary study The James Bond Dossier and the humorous The Book of Bond. Colonel Sun centres on the fictional British Secret Service operative James Bond and his mission to track down the kidnappers of M, his superior at the Secret Service. During the mission he discovers a communist Chinese plot to cause an international incident. Bond, assisted by a Greek spy working for the Russians, finds M on a small Aegean island, rescues him and kills the two main plotters: Colonel Sun Liang-tan and a former Nazi commander, Von Richter.

Amis drew upon a holiday he had taken in the Greek islands to create a realistic Greek setting and characters. He emphasised political intrigue in the plot more than Fleming had done in the canonical Bond novels, also adding revenge to Bond's motivations by including M's kidnapping. Despite keeping a format and structure similar to Fleming's Bond novels, Colonel Sun was given mixed reviews.

Colonel Sun was serialised in the Daily Express newspaper  from 18 March 1968 to 30 March 1968 and adapted as a comic strip in the same newspaper in 1969–1970. Elements from the story have been used in the Eon Productions Bond series: The 1999 film The World Is Not Enough used M's kidnapping, whilst the villain of the 2002 film Die Another Day, Colonel Tan-Sun Moon, owes his name to Colonel Sun Liang-tan. Chapter 19 ('The Theory and Practice of Torture') was adapted for the torture scene in Spectre (2015).  Though Blofeld replaced Sun as Bond's tormentor, much of Blofeld's dialogue in the scene was written by Amis for Sun, resulting in an acknowledgement to Amis' estate in the end title credits, though no mention of the book itself.

Plot
Kidnappers violently take the Secret Service chief M from his house and almost capture James Bond, who is visiting. Intent on rescuing M, Bond follows the clues to Vrakonisi, one of the Aegean Islands. In the process, Bond discovers the complex military-political plans of Colonel Sun of the Chinese People's Liberation Army. Sun had been sent to sabotage a Middle East détente conference which the Soviet Union is hosting. He intends to attack the conference venue and use M and Bond's bodies to blame Great Britain for the disaster, leading to a world war. Bond meets Soviet agents in Athens and they realise that not only is a third country behind the kidnap, but that there is a traitor in the organisation. An attack on the Soviet headquarters kills all the agents except Ariadne Alexandrou, a Greek Communist. As he is dying, the Soviet leader encourages Bond and Ariadne to work together to prevent an international incident.

Ariadne persuades Litsas, a former Second World War resistance fighter and friend of her late father, to help them by telling him about the involvement in the plot of former Nazi, Von Richter. Trying to find M and Colonel Sun, Bond is nearly captured by the Russians, but is saved by Litsas. Finally, Bond finds Sun's headquarters, but is knocked out by one of Sun's men; Bond learns that Von Richter will use a mortar to destroy the conference venue and that Bond will be tortured by Sun, before his inevitable demise. Sun tortures him brutally, until one of the girls at the house is ordered by Sun to caress Bond fondly. In the process she cuts one of Bond's hands free and provides him with a knife. She tells Sun that Bond is dead: when examined Bond stabs Sun. He then frees other captives who help Bond stop Von Richter. However Sun survives the stab wound and kills several of the other escapees. Bond tracks down Sun and kills him in the confrontation. The Soviets thank Bond for saving their conference, offering him the Order of the Red Banner for his work, which he politely turns down.

Characters and themes
The main character of the novel is James Bond. Continuation Bond author Raymond Benson described Amis's Bond as a humourless interpretation of the character that Fleming used in his earlier novels. Benson describes this personality as a natural continuation of the Bond developed in the final three Fleming novels. In all three novels, the events take a toll on Bond: he loses his wife in On Her Majesty's Secret Service; he loses his memory in Japan in You Only Live Twice; and he is brainwashed in Russia, is de-programmed by MI6 and almost dies from Francisco Scaramanga's poisoned bullet in The Man with the Golden Gun. Benson identifies Bond's desire for revenge as a central theme of the novel. The plot centres on Bond's need to avenge the death of the Hammonds and M's kidnapping. Benson describes this as particularly striking: "Bond is particularly brutal in achieving his goal ... The revenge is very satisfying. This is Bond at his toughest."

Benson considered that M's character evokes an emotional response from the reader because of the change from his usual, business-like manner to a semi-catatonic state upon being kidnapped. However, Amis envisaged something different for the character: he did not like M and, as one reviewer pointed out, in The James Bond Dossier, he had "spent a chapter running him down." The main villain of the novel is Colonel Sun Liang-tan. Sun is a member of the Special Activities Committee of the Chinese People's Liberation Army as well as a sadist and skilled torturer. Raymond Benson called him "very worthy of inclusion in the Bond saga".

Benson notes increased political intrigue in the novel compared to earlier Bond novels. In Colonel Sun, Bond acts in concert with the Russians against the Chinese, which demonstrates one of the main themes of the book: a peacekeeping between nations. Military historian Jeremy Black describes the novel reflecting a shift in the balance of world power away from two-party Cold War politics. To accentuate this idea of Oriental threat, the novel demonstrates a disregard by the Chinese for human life, a position similar to the treatment of the East in Fleming's Dr. No. Black also notes an emotional and social sadness throughout Colonel Sun. The social sadness is a reaction to the culture of modernity and mourning what was being lost in its place. This treatment by Amis is similar to Fleming's nostalgia in describing Paris in "From a View to a Kill".

Background

The original creator of James Bond, Ian Fleming, died in the early morning of 12 August 1964, eight months before the publication of The Man with the Golden Gun. After his death, Glidrose Productions (now Ian Fleming Publications) held the rights to Fleming's works. The company decided to publish two short stories, "Octopussy" and "The Living Daylights", on 23 June 1966.

As the Bond character could not be copyrighted, and to retain rights in the Bond product, Glidrose decided to commission a sequel. Initially the company approached author James Leasor to write a continuation novel, but he declined. Glidrose then commissioned Amis, who wrote Colonel Sun. Critic and future novelist Sally Beauman noted that it was "unusual, not to say unprecedented, for an established author to pick up the torch in this way," though she admits that "Bond [is] too big, and too profitable, a property to be placed in the hands of an unknown."

Fleming's wife, Ann, did not endorse any further Bond works and disliked Amis, saying that he would create "a petit bourgeois red brick Bond". 

In 1965, Amis produced The James Bond Dossier—a critical analysis of the Bond books under his own name—and The Book of Bond, a tongue-in-cheek manual for prospective agents, using the pseudonym Lt.-Col. William ("Bill") Tanner. Amis followed these books with the 1966 novel, The Anti-Death League, which had a plot filled with popular fiction elements and helped Amis prepare for Colonel Sun.

Amis and his wife Jane spent September 1965 holidaying on the Greek island of Spetses and Amis used his experiences as the background to the novel. Amis followed a tradition set by Fleming of using the names of people he knew or had met during the researches for his book and Amis drew on the names of people he met in Greece for Colonel Sun. The boat Bond uses—The Altair—was the name of the boat Amis and his wife used on holiday, whilst the Bond girl's fictitious colleagues, "Legakis" and "Papadogonas" were friends who helped Amis in Greece, whilst the doctor who treats Bond in Chapter two was named after Amis and Jane's own doctor.

In a 21 May 1967 letter to Philip Larkin, Amis mentioned that he had already finished writing the Bond novel.

Release and reception
Jonathan Cape published Colonel Sun on 28 March 1968; the book was 255 pages long and priced at a guinea. The novel sold well – journalist and author Eric Hiscock claims that by 1980 it had sold over 500,000 copies worldwide – and was listed second best seller in the "Books in demand" list of the Financial Times for March and April 1968. Harper & Row published the novel in the US on 1 May 1968; the United States edition ran to 244 pages.

Reviews
Colonel Sun was broadly welcomed by the critics, although a number noted that despite Amis's abilities as a writer, Fleming's own persona was missing from the novel. Roger Baker, writing in The Times, noted that from one angle Colonel Sun is a "neat, not over-inventive thriller, low on sex, high on violence and more than usually improbable"; however, he noted that once the elements of the re-incarnation of Bond and the writing of Kingsley Amis were taken into account, things were different. Baker thought that with Amis writing the story, "one might, justifiably, have expected a joyous rejuvenation or at least a devastating detour from the Fleming pattern. We get neither. It is a pale copy." D. J. Enright, writing in The Listener, considered that, in literary terms, Fleming's "inheritance has been well and aptly bestowed." He said that "Colonel Sun offers apt literary pabulum for Bond's fish-and-chip culture, for his neurotics, alcoholics and suicides. Good dirty fun, once read and soon forgotten".

Writing in The Times Literary Supplement, Simon Gray, unimpressed with the novel, called the Bond in Colonel Sun "a chuckle-headed imposter whose arthritic thought processes would be a liability in a 'physical tussle' down at the pub." He went on to comment that the novel only "offers the frustrated Bond addict ... a small academic problem, of swiftly passing interest." The Daily Mirrors reviewer, Alexander Muir, considered the book to be "an exciting, violent, sadistic and sexy piece of reading matter", although, partly because of Amis' abilities as a writer, Colonel Sun "is altogether too meticulous and well written – Fleming was a hypnotic but slapdash writer. And, at times, I sensed parody. This could be fatal."

Writing in The Guardian, Malcolm Bradbury called the novel "a reasonable read but no more: neither vintage Fleming nor vintage Amis." Bradbury also noted that "it lacks a convincing rhetoric ... and the traditional Fleming frissons emerge only in muted form." Maurice Richardson, reviewing Colonel Sun for The Observer, wrote that when being judged as a thriller, the novel "is vigorous, quite exciting, rather disorderly, a bit laboured". He went on to say that "Some of the action is quite well done and little more preposterous than in the later Flemings. The real trouble is the absence of spontaneous élan".

The reviewer for the Los Angeles Times, Charles Champlin, noted that the novel "lacks the garish, outrageous, ridiculous, symbol-witted touch of the original article"; despite that, he still enjoyed the novel, commenting that it left "intact the reputations of both Messrs. Amis and Fleming." Donald Stanley, writing in Life magazine praised the villain Sun, saying he "is the kind of villain to make a Bondophile salivate." In general Stanley praised Amis for emulating "the celebrated Fleming Effect". Stanley was less convinced by Bond, observing that his "essential swinishness is being replaced by some kind of dilute humanism".

The reviewer for The New York Times noted the reduced numbers of gadgets employed in the book, when compared with the films, that they felt had "overshadowed the personality of the secret agent"; overall the reviewer felt that "Mr. Amis has now given Bond back to the readers." Oberbeck commented that Bond "has become a sensitive man-of-ethics who suffers pangs of doubt and remorse over the 'senseless' violence of his profession". Oberbeck went on to say that Amis "never quite captures the bizarre beat of a Fleming pace"; most telling, according to Oberbeck, was that "the greatest flaw in Amis' conception of Bond is that he has attempted to transform the consummate spy-hero into something he was never meant to have been: a man with a job".

Sally Beauman, writing for New York, believed that "Amis has all the obvious ingredients for success", including "an exotic troubled international setting, a beautiful girl, frequent imbibings, and even more frequent killings; and, most imperative, a villain. Yet the book drags and becomes a bore." Beauman complains that the story lacks suspense and that Bond is far too gloomy: he's more like Ingmar Bergman's creations than Ian Fleming's hero. Beauman attributes the novel's failure to the "differing characters of the authors."

A fiftieth anniversary review in The Guardian  called Col. Sun "the most repellant racial caricature of all, a descendant of Fu Manchu and other fiendish orientals, noting that "Amis channels Fleming . . . as a connoisseur of ethnicities." The review notes that "Amis, by March 1968, had already made public his Damascene conversion from left to right, and signed a group letter to the Times titled Backing for US Policies in Vietnam."

Adaptations

Serialisation (1968)
Colonel Sun was serialised on a daily basis in the Daily Express newspaper from 18 March 1968 to 30 March 1968.

Comic strip (1969–1970)

Colonel Sun is the only non-Fleming Bond novel adapted as a comic strip by the Daily Express newspaper. It was adapted by Jim Lawrence and drawn by Yaroslav Horak and published in the Daily Express from 1 December 1969 to 20 August 1970 and was subsequently syndicated worldwide. In December 2005, Titan Books reprinted Colonel Sun and included River of Death, another original James Bond comic strip story published before the Colonel Sun strip in 1969.

The World Is Not Enough (1999)
The kidnap of M was borrowed from Colonel Sun and used as a plot device in the 1999 Bond film The World Is Not Enough.

Die Another Day (2002)
For the 2002 film Die Another Day, Eon Productions wanted to use the name Colonel Sun Liang-tan for the main villain, but when the Fleming estate insisted on royalties for the use of the name, they changed the name to Colonel Tan-Sun Moon.

Spectre (2015)
The 2015 film Spectre features a torture scene which was lifted from Colonel Sun.

See also

 Outline of James Bond

References

Bibliography

 
 
 
 
 
 
 
 
 
 

Fiction set in 1965
1968 British novels
James Bond books
Jonathan Cape books
Novels by Kingsley Amis
Novels first published in serial form
Novels set in the 1960s
Novels set in Greece
Novels set in the Mediterranean Sea
Novels set on islands
Fiction about the People's Liberation Army
Works about Chinese military personnel
Works originally published in the Daily Express
Works published under a pseudonym